Magi is a 2016 Turkish horror film directed and written by Hasan Karacadağ and starring Lucie Pohl, Michael Madsen, Stephen Baldwin and Brianne Davis. The film went on general release across Turkey on 29 April 2016.

Plot
Marla Watkins moved to Istanbul a few years ago. She now teaches English in a local language school. Her sister, Olivia, is a New York-based journalist. When informed about Marla's pregnancy, Olivia travels to Turkey to visit her sister. Marla lives in a fancy neighborhood. She was previously married to an Iranian artist, but the two have recently put an end to their relationship. Marla decided she'd keep the baby and that is when sinister happenings begin to occur.

Cast
 Michael Madsen as Lawrence Irlam
 Stephen Baldwin as Burga
 Brianne Davis as Marla Watkins
 Dragan Micanovic as Deyran
 Lucie Pohl as Olivia Watkins
 Emine Meyrem as Suzan
 Kenan Ece as Emir

References

External links
 
 

Genies in film
Films set in Turkey
Turkish horror films
2016 horror films
English-language Turkish films
2010s English-language films